Antonio Roldán Reyna (born 15 June 1946) was a Mexican boxer who competed in the featherweight division (– 57 kg) during his career as an amateur. He was born in Mexico City.

Amateur career
Roldán was a gold medalist at the 1968 Summer Olympics in the featherweight division. In the final he won a hotly disputed bout over silver medalist Al Robinson. Robinson was dominating the fight when suddenly the referee gave Robinson a warning, and about a minute later, the referee issued a second violation which resulted in an automatic disqualification.

1968 Olympic results
Below is the record of Antonio Roldán, a Mexican featherweight boxer who competed at the 1968 Mexico City Olympics:

 Round of 32: defeated Hwad Absel (Sudan) by decision, 5-0
 Round of 16: defeated Edward Tracey (Ireland) by decision, 4-1
 Quarterfinal: defeated Valery Plotnikov (Soviet Union) by decision, 4-1
 Semifinal: defeated Philip Wairunge (Kenya) by decision, 3-2
 Final: defeated Al Robinson (United States) by disqualification (won gold medal)

Professional career
Roldán had a brief pro career, retiring in 1973 after a KO loss to Armando Muñiz having won 3 and lost 2.

Notes

References

1946 births
Living people
Boxers from Mexico City
Featherweight boxers
Olympic boxers of Mexico
Boxers at the 1968 Summer Olympics
Olympic gold medalists for Mexico
Olympic medalists in boxing
Mexican male boxers
Medalists at the 1968 Summer Olympics
20th-century Mexican people